is a railway station in the city of Seki, Gifu Prefecture, Japan, operated by the third sector railway operator Nagaragawa Railway.

Lines

Station layout
Seki-Shiyakushomae Station has one ground-level side platform serving a single bi-directional track. There is no station building, and the station is unattended.

|-
!colspan=5|Nagaragawa Railway

History
Seki-Shiyakushomae Station was opened on April 1, 1999.

Surrounding area
Seki City Hall

See also
 List of Railway Stations in Japan

References

External links

 

Railway stations in Japan opened in 1999
Railway stations in Gifu Prefecture
Stations of Nagaragawa Railway
Seki, Gifu